Cinenova  is a non-profit organisation based in London, dedicated to distributing films and videos made by women. 
Formed in 1991 from the merger of two feminist distributors, Circles and Cinema of Women, Cinenova 
provides the means to discover and watch experimental films, narrative feature films, artists film and 
video, documentary and educational videos. 

Through national and international distribution, Cinenova acts as an agency for artists, educators, 
curators and their audiences. Cinenova is a source of very specific knowledge, a network and cultural 
community that engages directly with Women's Film and video work, and with the question of how to 
make this knowledge more publicly accessible. Cinenova offers an extensive archive and expert advice 
relating to film and video directed by women, with a practice informed by its history as a key resource 
in the UK independent film and video distribution sector.

See also 
Women's Cinema

References

External links 
Lux
Cinenova Website

Film organisations in the United Kingdom
Cultural organisations based in London